Jack J. Beatty (born May 15, 1945) is a writer, senior editor of The Atlantic, and news analyst for On Point, the national NPR news program.

Born and raised in the Dorchester neighborhood of Boston, Beatty attended Boston Latin School, Boston State College, and the University of Massachusetts Boston. He lives in Hanover, New Hampshire.

Awards
 1990 - Guggenheim Fellowship
 1993 - American Book Award
 1993 - L.L. Winship/PEN New England Award, The Rascal King: The Life and Times of James Michael Curley (1874-1958)
 Poynter Fellow at Yale University 
 Two Alfred P. Sloan Foundation research grants
 William Allen White Award for Criticism
 Olive Branch Award for an Atlantic article on arms control

Bibliography

 
 
 
"A Miserable Failure", The Atlantic,  September 24, 2003 
 

 The Lost History of 1914: How the Great War was Not Inevitable. London; Berlin [u.a.]: Bloomsbury, 2012. .

References

External links
"Interview with Jack Beatty", Claremont college

1945 births
Living people
21st-century American historians
21st-century American male writers
American Book Award winners
American editors
The Atlantic (magazine) people
Boston Latin School alumni
Boston State College alumni
Historians from Massachusetts
People from Hanover, New Hampshire
University of Massachusetts Boston alumni
Writers from Boston
American male non-fiction writers